Lorie Skjerven Gildea (born October 6, 1961) is an American attorney and jurist serving as Chief Justice of the Minnesota Supreme Court. She served as an associate justice on the Court from 2006 to 2010 and as a district judge for Hennepin County in the Fourth Judicial District from 2005 to 2006.

Early life and education
Gildea was born on October 6, 1961, and raised in Plummer, Minnesota. She received a Bachelor of Arts, with distinction, from the University of Minnesota Morris in 1983, and a Juris Doctor, magna cum laude, from the Georgetown University Law Center in 1986.

Career 
After law school, she remained in Washington, D.C. and entered private practice at Arent Fox.

Gildea later returned to Minnesota where, after working briefly as a special prosecutor for the city of Minneapolis, she became an associate general counsel for the University of Minnesota. She represented the University system for 11 years, including during the scandal involving former men's basketball coach Clem Haskins. She served on the Minnesota Sentencing Guidelines Commission from 2001 to 2004 under Governors Jesse Ventura and Tim Pawlenty.

Judicial service
Pawlenty appointed Gildea an associate justice of the Minnesota Supreme Court in 2006. Her seat on the Court was up for election in 2008. She defeated three opponents in the primary election and Hennepin County District Judge Deborah Hedlund in the general election. In 2010, Pawlenty appointed her chief justice of the Minnesota Supreme Court, replacing Eric Magnuson. Her term as chief justice began on July 1, 2010, and she was sworn in at a July 12 ceremony in Saint Paul.

In 2012, Gildea was reelected chief justice, defeating Daniel Griffith in the general election with 60% of the vote. In 2018, Gildea was again reelected chief justice, unopposed.

Personal life
Gildea lives in the Lowry Hill neighborhood of Minneapolis. She is an accomplished equestrian. She was married to Andrew J. "Andy" Gildea, whom she met in law school. He died on November 5, 2021.

References

External links
Chief Justice Lorie Skjerven Gildea, Minnesota Judicial Branch.
Philip J. Trobaugh, Judge Lorie Skjerven Gildea, Hennepin Lawyer, December 22, 2005.
"New Minnesota Chief Justice on MPR's Midday program" MPR News: July 1, 2010

|-

1961 births
Living people
20th-century American women lawyers
20th-century American lawyers
21st-century American judges
21st-century American women judges
Chief Justices of the Minnesota Supreme Court
Georgetown University Law Center alumni
Justices of the Minnesota Supreme Court
People from Red Lake County, Minnesota
University of Minnesota Morris alumni
Women chief justices of state supreme courts in the United States